Khachia is a monotypic snout moth genus described by Hans Georg Amsel in 1961. Its only species, Khachia albicostella, is known from Iran.

References

Anerastiini
Monotypic moth genera
Moths of Asia
Pyralidae genera
Taxa named by Hans Georg Amsel